Ramb IV was an Italian hospital ship, built at Monfalcone by the United Yards of the Adriatic (Cantieri Riuniti dell'Adriatico, CRDA) in 1938.

Ramb IV was the last of four sister ships all built to the same design.

The four ships were built for the Royal Banana Monopoly Business (Regia Azienda Monopolio Banane). These ships were originally devised as "banana boats" for transporting refrigerated bananas from Somaliland and Eritrea in Italian East Africa.

In the event of war, the design of Ramb IV allowed it to be refitted as an "auxiliary cruiser" for commerce raiding.  She was 3,667 tons displacement, oil powered, and capable of  knots. Following a declaration of war, Ramb IV was capable of being armed with two  guns and eight  anti-aircraft guns and of becoming an auxiliary cruiser.

Instead, Ramb IV was converted into a hospital ship for the Italian Royal Navy (Regia Marina). The goal of Ramb IV, in case of fall of Eritrea, was transporting Italian wounded back to Italy. However, this mission was impossible because of the British control of the Suez Canal. In addition, it would have been suicide to attempt to round the Cape of Good Hope and enter the Mediterranean Sea past Gibraltar. The work to convert the banana boat to a hospital ship was performed at the Eritrean port of Massawa. Ramb IV was part of the Italian Navy's Red Sea Flotilla.

When the port of Massawa fell on 10 April 1941 during the East African Campaign, the British captured Ramb IV. Pressed into British service, she then operated in the Red Sea and later off Libya. Ramb IV was bombed and set afire by German aircraft and sank off Alexandria in Egypt on 10 May 1942.

See also
Ramb I
Ramb II
Ramb III
 Italian Royal Navy - RN Ramb IV and Aquileia
 East African Campaign

References

Bibliography

Naval ships of Italy captured by the United Kingdom during World War II
Hospital ships of Italy
Hospital ships in World War II
World War II naval ships of the United Kingdom
Ships sunk by German aircraft
1937 ships
RAMB ships
Ships built by Cantieri Riuniti dell'Adriatico
Ships built in Monfalcone
Maritime incidents in May 1942
Captured ships